The Cache la Poudre-North Park Scenic Byway is a  National Forest Scenic Byway and Colorado Scenic and Historic Byway located in Jackson and Larimer counties, Colorado, US.

See also
History Colorado
List of scenic byways in Colorado
Scenic byways in the United States

References

External links
America's Scenic Byways: Colorado
Colorado Department of Transportation
Colorado Scenic & Historic Byways Commission
Colorado Scenic & Historic Byways
Colorado Travel Map
Colorado Tourism Office
History Colorado
National Forest Scenic Byways

Colorado Scenic and Historic Byways
National Forest Scenic Byways
National Forest Scenic Byways in Colorado
Roosevelt National Forest
Routt National Forest
Transportation in Colorado
Transportation in Jackson County, Colorado
Transportation in Larimer County, Colorado
Tourist attractions in Colorado
Tourist attractions in Jackson County, Colorado
Tourist attractions in Larimer County, Colorado
U.S. Route 287